St. Monica's is a Roman Catholic parish church in Bootle, Merseyside. The church building was designed by the architect F. X. Velarde. Construction was started in 1930 and completed in 1936, and the church was dedicated by Archbishop Richard Downey on 4 October that year. It is a brick structure with a green glaze pantile roof, and is a Grade I listed building. The church is inspired by German churches of the 1930s. Three sculptures of angels were sculpted by H. Tyson Smith. Other sculptures include winged creatures. The current priest is Father Pat Sexton who has been at the church since 2001 after he succeeded Canon O'Connor.

See also
Listed buildings in Bootle
List of works by F. X. Velarde

References

External links

 Parish Home Page
 Picture and description from English Heritage

Buildings and structures in the Metropolitan Borough of Sefton
Roman Catholic churches in Merseyside
Grade II listed Roman Catholic churches in England
Grade I listed churches in Merseyside
Bootle
Art Deco architecture in England
F. X. Velarde buildings
Roman Catholic Archdiocese of Liverpool